Frank Hillyard Swinstead (6 August 1862 – 6 December 1937) was an English first-class cricketer and artist.

Swinstead was born at Chelsea to Charles Swinstead, the master of the North London School of Art, and his second wife, Jane Swinstead (née Hillyard). He was educated at the North London School of Art, before attending the Royal College of Art and Académie Julian in Paris. After graduating, he became an art master, taking over the Hornsey College of Art (formerly the North London School of Art) from his father following his death in 1890. Two years prior to taking over the college, Swinstead appeared in a first-class cricket match for the Gentlemen of England against Cambridge University at Cambridge. He married Lilie Caroline Drew in 1890, with the couple having three sons. He made a second appearance in first-class cricket for the Marylebone Cricket Club against Worcestershire at Lord's in 1900. He later became the principle of the Willesden Polytechnic School of Art and was elected to the Royal Society of British Artists in 1908. He exhibited three paintings of various scenes from Suffolk to the Royal Society of British Artists in 1929. He died at Hornsey Central Hospital in December 1937.

References

External links

1862 births
1937 deaths
Académie Julian alumni
Alumni of the Royal College of Art
Artists from London
Cricketers from Chelsea, London
English cricketers
Gentlemen of England cricketers
Marylebone Cricket Club cricketers
Members of the Royal Society of British Artists
Heads of schools in London